The Nur Mosque is a mosque in Charlotte Amalie, Saint Thomas, United States Virgin Islands.

History
The mosque was originally constructed in 1978 as the Muhammad Mosque as the first mosque in the territory. It was then later renamed as the Nur Mosque.

See also
 Religion in the United States Virgin Islands

References

1978 establishments in the United States Virgin Islands
Islam in the United States Virgin Islands
Mosques completed in 1978
Mosques in North America
Religious buildings and structures in the United States Virgin Islands
Saint Thomas, U.S. Virgin Islands